Kellaway is a surname, and may refer to

 Andrew Kellaway (Australian rules footballer), Australian football player
 Andrew Kellaway, Australian rugby player
 Bob Kellaway, Australian rugby league footballer
 Cecil Kellaway, British actor
 Charles Kellaway, Australian medical scientist and science administrator 
 Duncan Kellaway, Australian football player
 Frederick Kellaway, British politician
 Joseph Kellaway, British sailor and recipient of the Victoria Cross
 Lionel Kelleway, British radio presenter
 Lucy Kellaway, British newspaper columnist
 Roger Kellaway, American composer
 Stuart Kellaway, Australian musician, founder member of Yothu Yindi

See also
 Calloway
 Kelleway